Abbeyshrule is a village in south-east County Longford, Ireland, on the River Inny and the Royal Canal.

History
The village takes its name from the Irish language word for a river or stream (sruth) and from the early medieval Cistercian abbey, the ruins of which still survive on the banks of the Inny. While the original medieval settlement built up around this religious site and the nearby fording point on the river, a number of archaeological finds (including of the Clonbrin Shield in 1906) indicate activity in the area from at least the Bronze Age.

The building of the Royal Canal in the early nineteenth century, which required the construction of the Whitworth aqueduct across the Inny, brought increasing trade to the village until the mid twentieth century.

Abbeyshrule won the 2012 National Tidy Towns Award with a total of 312 marks. The village also claimed the award for Ireland's Tidiest Village 2012. Abbeyshrule subsequently won a Gold Medal Award at the European Entente Florale Competition.

Notable people
The novelist, playwright and poet Oliver Goldsmith is believed to have been born in 1728 at Pallas, very near to the village, where his father resided as a local curate. The location is marked by a replica of the Goldsmith statue found at the entrance to Trinity College Dublin.

John Graham, a prolific author and senior officer of the Orange Order, was born here.

Amenities
The village is located in the Irish midlands between Athlone, Longford and Mullingar.

The Abbeyshrule Aerodrome is located just outside the village, while the Royal Canal has been reopened to tourist marine traffic in recent years.

See also
 List of towns and villages in Ireland

References

Towns and villages in County Longford